"Loyalty to the Country" is a Chinese patriotic song paying tribute to the Han general Yue Fei, a popular Chinese folk hero. The name of the song refers to a phrase tattooed on the back of Yue Fei, and a mantra with which he is commonly identified. The lyrics of the song allude to the Jin–Song Wars, in which Yue Fei played a pivotal role.

Basis
The title Loyalty to the Country refers to a popular semi-historical legend surrounding Yue Fei. According to these accounts, Yue Fei had the Chinese characters jin zhong bao guo (simplified Chinese: 尽忠报国; traditional Chinese: 盡忠報國; pinyin: jìn zhōng bào guó; literally: "serve the country with the utmost loyalty") tattooed across his back by his mother to ensure his dedication to the state. According to The Story of King Yue Who Restored the Song dynasty (《大宋中興岳王傳》), one of the earliest Ming era works chronicling the general, Yue Fei would show the tattoo to soldiers when he detected that they wished to desert, and he implored a number of his men to have the characters tattooed on their backs. The legend has undergone a number of fictionalisations across its centuries long history, and remains a popular element of Chinese folklore today.

Lyrics

See also
Jin-Song Wars
Yue Fei
The Great Wall Ballad
"Ode to the Motherland"

References

Chinese patriotic songs